Jean Capdouze (1942-1999) was a French rugby union and rugby league footballer who played in the 1960s and 1970s. He first played rugby union, representing his country in several test matches before turning professional and playing to rugby league, playing for the XIII Catalan club and for France's national team in the 1968 and 1970 World Cups.

References

1942 births
1999 deaths
Dual-code rugby internationals
France international rugby union players
France national rugby league team players
French rugby league players
French rugby union players
Rugby league five-eighths
Sportspeople from Pyrénées-Atlantiques
XIII Catalan players
People from Béarn
Rugby union fly-halves
Section Paloise players